Carmunnock is a conservation village within the City of Glasgow boundary, lying within  of East Kilbride and Rutherglen in South Lanarkshire and Busby in East Renfrewshire. The nearest other district within Glasgow is Castlemilk. 

This ancient settlement which is associated with the early Christian missionary Saint Cadoc, has a medieval street plan set within the lands of an estate held by variously the Morays of Bothwell, the Earls of Douglas and eventually to the Lords, Marquesses and Dukes of Hamilton until 1700 when it passed to the Stuarts of Castlemilk.

The village is a popular residential area. The village has its own primary school (Carmunnock Primary School) with around 178 pupils. There is also a newsagent/village shop.

The village hosts its own Highland Games.

Religion
The only religious body in Carmunnock is the Church of Scotland's Carmunnock Parish Church on Kirk Road, which is also known as 'The Kirk in the Braes'. The original church was built on site of the current Church around 800 years, with the current building being built in 1767 in the Civil Parish of Carmunnock. The church features external stone staircases to three galleries within the sanctuary and contains examples of stained glass by Norman Macleod MacDougall.

The church is surrounded by the old village graveyard which includes a watch-house with original instructions for grave watchers of 1828, when grave robbing was a problem. Within the structure of the church is a vault where some members of the Stirling-Stewart family, the Lairds of Castlemilk, are buried.

Transport
The village's only public transport link is the number 31 bus service operated by  First Glasgow to Glasgow City Centre and East Kilbride. The nearest train station is at Busby, which is on the East Kilbride to Glasgow line.

The main route through the village is the B759 which runs from Busby, East Renfrewshire to Cambuslang.

Etymology
Carmunnock is of Brythonic origin, from Celtic caer "fort" with an unknown second element. The name was recorded as Cerminok in 1183. Mynach in modern Welsh means "monk".

References

External links

Carmunnock at Gazetteer for Scotland
Video footage of the Stables, Bridge and Glen

Villages in Glasgow (council area)
Architectural conservation
Civil parishes of Scotland